Datex II or Datex2 is a data exchange standard for exchanging traffic information between traffic management centres, traffic service providers, traffic operators and media partners. It contains for example traffic incidents, current road works and other special traffic-related events. These data is presented in XML-format and is modeled with UML.
The standard is developed by the technical body Intelligent transport systems (CEN/TC 278) of the European Committee for Standardization.

The standard contains 12 parts:
 Context and framework
 Location referencing
 Situation publication
 Variable Message Sign (VMS) Publications
 Measured and Elaborated Data Publications
 Parking Publications
 Common data elements
 Traffic management publications and extensions dedicated to the urban environment
 Traffic signal management publications dedicated to the urban environment
 Energy infrastructure
 Publication of machine interpretable traffic regulations
 Facility related publications

References

External links
 Official Datex II website
 Datex II example messages
 Datex on openstreetmap 

EN standards
Intelligent transportation systems